Timothy Ferguson (born January 22, 1955) is a Republican former State Senator from Maryland.

Background
In 1994, Timothy Ferguson was first elected to the Maryland State Senate to represent District 4, which covers parts of Carroll and Frederick Counties. In that election, he defeated Democratic challenger George Littrell, a former member of the Maryland House of Delegates.

In 1998, Ferguson ran for reelection, defeating Democrat George Littrell with 55% of the vote.

In 2002, Ferguson ran for reelection, but was overwhelmingly defeated by fellow Republican and former Maryland Delegate David R. Brinkley in the primary election. Brinkley went on to defeat Timothy Schlauch in the general election.

Education

Ferguson attended Eastern Vocational-Technical High School in Essex, Maryland. He later attended Broome County Community College in Broome, New York where he majored in Computer-Aided-Design. Broome Community College is part of the SUNY two-year college program.

He earned a Private Pilot's License in 1985 while working for Sundstrand Corporation in Rockford, Illinois.

He was fully trained in 2008 as a Lean Six Sigma "Green Belt." He earned a "CMIIC" certification from the Institute of Configuration Management in March 2009 and a "CMIIP" certification in November 2009. He has spoken at ICM Annual conferences and formed a corporation, ARTIS Professionals, LLC, for consultation and implementation of program acquisition process improvements and configuration management.

Career
Ferguson was a member of the South Carroll Republican Club, serving as President in 1992.  Outside of his political work, he was a member of the Farm Bureau, the Jaycees, the 4-H, and the Chamber of Commerce. He also is a Life Member of the National Rifle Association (NRA).

While working in the State Senate, Ferguson was a member of the Executive Nominations Committee from 1995 until 2000, and the Judicial Proceedings Committee from 1995 until 2003. In addition, he was a member of the Joint Committee on Investigation from 1995 until 2003 and the Joint Committee on Children, Youth, and Families from 1999 until 2003. Finally, he was chair of the Frederick County Delegation from 1999 until 2003.

Despite his lifetime membership in the NRA, Ferguson has been labeled by some as supporting gun control. This claim most likely stems from a proposed filibuster in which Ferguson did not participate, on a gun control bill. According to Ferguson and others, the bill would have easily defeated the filibuster in its original form, leaving gun rights advocates with no concessions. This led to criticism from NRA spokesman Greg Costa in 2002.

Election results

2002

1998

1994

References

External links
 http://www.msa.md.gov/msa/mdmanual/05sen/former/html/msa12165.html

Democratic Party Maryland state senators
Politicians from Baltimore
1955 births
Living people